WIBS (1540 AM, Radio Caribe) is a radio station broadcasting a Spanish Variety format. Licensed to Guayama, Puerto Rico, the station serves the Puerto Rico area.  The station is owned by International Broadcasting Corporation. The station is shared with translator station W293DE 106.5 FM also located in Guayama.

History
The station was assigned the call letters WBJA on February 23, 1981.  On October 5, 1989, the station changed its call sign to WIBS.

Translator stations

References

External links

Radio stations established in 1981
IBS
Guayama, Puerto Rico
1981 establishments in Puerto Rico
Variety radio stations in Puerto Rico